FC Sambir (previously known as FC Promin Sambir) is a Ukrainian football club from Sambir, Lviv Oblast. The club was established in the village of Volia-Baranetska, Sambir Raion, but later moved to the district centre.

Before 1992, there also existed another club Spartak Sambir.

League and cup history

{|class="wikitable"
|-bgcolor="#efefef"
! Season
! Div.
! Pos.
! Pl.
! W
! D
! L
! GS
! GA
! P
!Domestic Cup
!colspan=2|Europe
!Notes
|-
|align=center|1992
|align=center|3
|align=center|16
|align=center|16
|align=center|1
|align=center|7
|align=center|8
|align=center|22
|align=center|28
|align=center|9
|align=center|
|align=center|
|align=center|
|align=center bgcolor=red|Relegated
|-
|align=center|1992–93
|align=center|3B
|align=center|10
|align=center|34
|align=center|14
|align=center|4
|align=center|16
|align=center|46
|align=center|43
|align=center|32
|align=center|
|align=center|
|align=center|
|align=center|
|-
|align=center|1993–94
|align=center|3B
|align=center|14
|align=center|34
|align=center|12
|align=center|4
|align=center|18
|align=center|32
|align=center|48
|align=center|28
|align=center|
|align=center|
|align=center|
|align=center bgcolor=red|Relegated
|-
|align=center|1994–95
|align=center|4
|align=center|4
|align=center|24
|align=center|11
|align=center|8
|align=center|5
|align=center|33
|align=center|23
|align=center|41
|align=center|
|align=center|
|align=center|
|align=center|
|-
|align=center|1995–96
|align=center|
|align=center|
|align=center|
|align=center|
|align=center|
|align=center|
|align=center|
|align=center|
|align=center|
|align=center|Q1 round
|align=center|
|align=center|
|align=center|
|-
|align=center|1996–97
|align=center|4
|align=center|2
|align=center|12
|align=center|5
|align=center|3
|align=center|4
|align=center|11
|align=center|12
|align=center|18
|align=center|
|align=center|
|align=center|
|align=center|
|-
|align=center rowspan=2|1997–98
|align=center rowspan=2|4
|align=center|2
|align=center|8
|align=center|5
|align=center|2
|align=center|1
|align=center|12
|align=center|10
|align=center|17
|align=center rowspan=2|
|align=center rowspan=2|
|align=center rowspan=2|
|align=center|to Finals
|-
|align=center|3
|align=center|2
|align=center|0
|align=center|0
|align=center|2
|align=center|0
|align=center|2
|align=center|0
|align=center|lost promotion play-off to Tysmenytsia
|-
|align=center rowspan=2|2011
|align=center rowspan=2|4
|align=center|1
|align=center|12
|align=center|8
|align=center|3
|align=center|1
|align=center|24
|align=center|5
|align=center|27
|align=center rowspan=2|
|align=center rowspan=2|
|align=center rowspan=2|
|align=center|to Finals
|-
|align=center|2
|align=center|3
|align=center|1
|align=center|2
|align=center|0
|align=center|3
|align=center|2
|align=center|5
|align=center|
|}

Players

Gallery

References

Amateur football clubs in Ukraine
Association football clubs established in 1931
1931 establishments in Ukraine
Football clubs in Lviv Oblast
Sambir